Wayne Fitzgerald Blackshear (born February 11, 1992) is an American professional basketball player who last played for the Maine Celtics of the NBA G League. He played college basketball for the Louisville Cardinals.

High school and college career
Blackshear played basketball for Curie Metropolitan High School before transferring to crosstown rival Morgan Park High School. He earned 2010 and 2011 first team All-State recognition from the Chicago Tribune, and was 2011 Chicago Sun-Times Sun-Times Player of the Year. He was a 2011 McDonald's All-American and a Parade All-American.

Between 2011 and 2015, Blackshear played college basketball for the Louisville Cardinals. As a sophomore in 2012–13, he helped the Cardinals win the 2013 NCAA Men's Division I Basketball Tournament. As a senior in 2014–15, Blackshear earned second-team Academic All-American honors and averaged 11.6 points and 4.3 rebounds in 32 games.

Professional career
After going undrafted in the 2015 NBA draft, Blackshear played for the San Antonio Spurs in the Orlando and Las Vegas NBA Summer Leagues. For the 2015–16 season, Blackshear moved to Italy to play for Giorgio Tesi Group Pistoia in the Italian first division. In 31 games, he averaged 10.7 points and 3.4 rebounds per game.

After playing for the Charlotte Hornets during the 2016 Orlando Summer League, Blackshear returned to Italy for the 2016–17 season, this time with Unieuro Forlì in the Italian second division. Due to a knee injury, he played only 14 games for Forlì. He averaged 15.5 points, 5.2 rebounds, 1.7 assists and 1.4 steals per game.

Between December 22, 2017, and January 6, 2018, Blackshear played four games in Lebanon with Byblos Club. He averaged 15.5 points, 6.8 rebounds, 1.3 assists and 1.8 steals per game.

For the 2018–19 season, Blackshear moved to Finland to play for the Helsinki Seagulls. In 24 games, he averaged 18.1 points, 4.5 rebounds, 1.8 assists and 1.1 steals per game.

For the 2019–20 season, Blackshear joined the Maine Red Claws of the NBA G League.

On February 18, 2020, Blackshear signed with the Franklin Bulls in New Zealand for the 2020 NBL season.

On July 28, 2020, Blackshear signed with Spójnia Stargard of the PLK. In five games, Blackshear averaged 8.2 points and 3.2 rebounds per game. On October 25, 2020, he parted ways with the team.

On October 23, 2021, Blackshear signed with the Maine Celtics. He did not make the team's final roster.

On December 31, 2021, Blackshear was acquired by the Long Island Nets. However, he was removed from the team on January 19, 2022.

Maine Celtics (2022)
On February 11, Blackshear was acquired by the Maine Celtics. He was then later waived on February 27, 2022.

References

External links
Louisville Cardinals bio
2015 NBA Summer League profile

1992 births
Living people
American expatriate basketball people in Finland
American expatriate basketball people in Italy
American expatriate basketball people in Lebanon
American expatriate basketball people in New Zealand
American expatriate basketball people in Poland
American men's basketball players
Basketball players from Chicago
Helsinki Seagulls players
Long Island Nets players
Louisville Cardinals men's basketball players
Maine Red Claws players
McDonald's High School All-Americans
Parade High School All-Americans (boys' basketball)
Pistoia Basket 2000 players
Shooting guards
Small forwards